William Price Knight (January 20, 1979 – July 8, 2018) was an American professional basketball player. He played college basketball for the UCLA Bruins. His last professional stops were in Japan with Hamamatsu, Osaka, Hyogo and Yamagata.

Early life
He attended high school at Westchester High in Los Angeles. As a sophomore, he was a reserve at center when Knight's father decided that his son's chances for an athletic scholarship to college rested on his jump-shooting skills. Knight was already tall, so his father set up dummies in their backyard court that he would be forced to shoot over. As a senior, he had developed into one of the top jump shooters nationally and committed to play college basketball for the UCLA Bruins.

Professional career
Knight helped the Hamamatsu Higashimikawa Phoenix to their first bj league title in 2009–2010, when he was the league's third-leading scorer, averaging 19.6 points per game. He and teammate Wendell White formed a duo dubbed the "White-Knight Show". In 2012–13, he helped lead the Hyogo Storks to their first Japan Basketball League (JBL2) championship.

Criminal allegations and death
On June 13, 2018, Knight was arrested on six counts of molestation charges, including two counts of sexual conduct with a minor.
He died by suicide through multiple blunt force injuries on July 8 after jumping from a building in Phoenix, Arizona, shortly after posting a video to YouTube talking about his mental illness and encouraged others to seek help.

Career statistics

Professional

Regular season 

|-
| align="left" | 2003-04
| align="left" |Orléans 
| 9||  || 29.3|| .450|| .447|| .722|| 5.3|| 2.0|| 1.3|| 0.0|| 17.7
|-
| align="left" | 2003-04
| align="left" |Akropol  
| 30||  || 30.1|| .539|| .500|| .836|| 7.4|| 2.1|| 1.4|| 0.1|| 28.9
|-
| align="left" | 2005-06
| align="left" |Vichy 
| 12||  || 30.4|| .401|| .275|| .773|| 5.6|| 1.5|| 1.9|| 0.3|| 15.7
|-
| align="left" | 2007-08
| align="left" |Portel 
| 31||  || 26.6|| .499|| .369|| .764|| 3.0|| 1.7|| 2.3|| 0.1|| 16.0
|-
| align="left" | 2008-09
| align="left" |Boulazac  
| 19||  || 26.8|| .534|| .439|| .775|| 4.3|| 1.8|| 1.2|| 0.0|| 14.9
|-
| align="left"  style="background-color:#afe6ba; border: 1px solid gray" | 2009-10†
| align="left" | Hamamatsu
| 47|| 29|| 26.2|| .413|| .395|| .795|| 5.4|| 2.0|| 1.3|| 0.3|| 19.6
|-
| align="left" |  2010-11
| align="left" | Osaka
| 50||37 || 25.0|| .457|| .357|| .797|| 7.3|| 2.0|| 1.3|| 0.3||  17.1
|-
| align="left" |  2013-14
| align="left" | Hyogo
| 54|| 53|| 26.6|| .385|| .367|| .843|| 6.8|| 1.1|| 1.4|| 0.3||  17.6
|-
| align="left" |  2014-15
| align="left" | Hyogo
| 54|| || 16.9|| .420|| .284|| .836|| 3.6|| 0.7|| 0.9|| 0.2||  13.1
|-
| align="left" |  2015-16
| align="left" | Yamagata
| 36|| 9|| 21.9|| .470|| .392|| .847|| 8.9|| 1.2|| 1.1|| 0.6||  21.1
|-
|}

Playoffs

|-
|style="text-align:left;"|2010-11
|style="text-align:left;"|Osaka
| 4 ||  || 26.5|| .421 || .000 || .783 || 8.0 || 3.0 || 1.3 || 0.0 || 16.5
|-

College

|-
| style="text-align:left;"| 1997-98
| style="text-align:left;"| UCLA
|24  ||  ||  ||.444  ||.387  ||.727 || 0.9 ||0.1  || 0.2 ||0.0  || 2.8
|-
| style="text-align:left;"| 1998-99
| style="text-align:left;"| UCLA
|  ||  ||  ||  ||  || ||  ||  ||  ||  || 
|-
| style="text-align:left;"| 1999-00
| style="text-align:left;"| UCLA
| 28 ||  ||  || .453 || .397 || .656|| 2.1 ||0.7  || 0.5 || 0.0 || 5.4
|-
| style="text-align:left;"| 2000-01
| style="text-align:left;"| UCLA
| 32 || 18 ||  || .460 || .421 || .732|| 1.9 ||0.6  ||0.6 || 0.1 || 7.9
|-
| style="text-align:left;"| 2001–02 
| style="text-align:left;"| UCLA
| 33 || 33 || 29.0 || .458 || .397 || .826|| 3.5 ||1.4  ||1.2 || 0.1 || 14.1
|-
|- class="sortbottom"
! style="text-align:center;" colspan=2|  Career 

!117 ||51 || 29.0 ||.456  || .403 ||.774  || 2.2 ||0.7  || 0.7 ||0.1  || 8.0
|-

References

External links

UCLA Bruins bio
Stats in Japan

1979 births
2018 deaths
2018 suicides
American expatriate basketball people in Cyprus
American expatriate basketball people in France
American expatriate basketball people in Japan
American expatriate basketball people in Sweden
American expatriate basketball people in Venezuela
Nishinomiya Storks players
Osaka Evessa players
Passlab Yamagata Wyverns players
San-en NeoPhoenix players
Trotamundos B.B.C. players
UCLA Bruins men's basketball players
American men's basketball players
Shooting guards
People charged with sex crimes
Suicides by jumping in the United States
Suicides in Arizona